This is the list of sport climbers who participated at the 2020 Summer Olympics in Tokyo, Japan from 3 to 6 August.

Male sport climbers

Female sport climbers

References 

Sport climbing at the 2020 Summer Olympics
Badminton